is an art form originating in Japan where people plant rice of various types and colors to create images in a paddy field.

History 

In 1993, the people of Inakadate, in Aomori Prefecture, were looking for a way to revitalize their village. Archaeological exploration led to a realization that rice had been grown in the area for more than 2000 years. To honor this history, the villagers started a rice field behind the town hall. With the paddy as a canvas, the villagers cultivated and used four different types of heirloom and modern strains of rice to create a giant picture in the field. To allow viewing of the whole picture, a mock castle tower 22 meters high was erected at the village office. In 2006, more than 200,000 people visited the village to see the art.

Another observation tower was built looking down the Tambo art location 2 at Michi no eki Inakadate nicknamed “Yayoi no sato” or a village of prehistoric Yayoi period. Both places charge admission fees, while visitors are encouraged to take bus serving both location 1 and 2 to avoid traffic jam. In August 2015, a video camera was installed for both locations and started live stream the art, and they were registered on Google Street View the same year. A winter campaign since 2016 has been held on location 2 with instruction initially by snow artist Simon Beck.

For the first nine years, the farmers created a simple picture of Mount Iwaki before going to more complex designs.

Following Inakadate's example, other villages such as Yonezawa in Yamagata prefecture have started to create their own tambo art.

Inakadate designs

The following is a list of the designs that have been used in the Inakadate pictures.
 2003 – Leonardo da Vinci, "Mona Lisa"
 2004 – Shikō Munakata – "Two Bodhisattvas and Ten Great Disciples of Shakamuni Buddha" and "Queen Mountain God"
 2005 – Sharaku – "Otani Oniji", Utamaro – "Anthology of Poems: The Love Section"
 2006 – Tawaraya Sōtatsu – "Fujin and Raijin"
 2007 – Hokusai – from Thirty-six Views of Mount Fuji: "The Great Wave off Kanagawa" and "South Wind, Clear Sky"
 2008 – Ebisu, Daikokuten
 2009 – Sengoku military commanders, Napoleon
 2010 – Heian period military commanders involved in Siege of Koromogawa, Minamoto no Yoshitsune and Benkei
 2011 – The Tale of the Bamboo Cutter
 2012 - Kano Hogai - "Hibo Kannon ('Kannon the Merciful Mother') and Acala": the Seven Lucky Gods
 2013 - Geisha and Marilyn Monroe, Ultraman
 2014 - Swan maiden, Mount Fuji and Sazae-san
 2015 - Gone With the Wind, Star Wars
 2016 - Shin Godzilla, Ishida Mitsunari and Sanada Masayuki from “Sanadamaru”, a 2016 Japanese drama for NHK
 2017 - Yamata no Orochi against Susanoo-no-mikoto, Momotarō
 2018 - Roman Holiday, Osamu Tezuka, the illustrator of Astro Boy

Production 
Every April, the villagers meet and decide what to plant for the year. Prior to planting, farmers sketch out the designs on computers to figure out where and how to plant the rice. In 2007, 700 people helped plant rice. Agreements between landowners have allowed for larger pictures to be created.

Advertising controversy 
In 2008, it was planned to change the lower part of the field to include the logos of Japan Airlines and To-o Nippo, a local newspaper, for a reported 2 million yen to offset increased costs. The members of the local landowners' organization, along with the former mayor, protested, saying that the land would not be leased from the following year if the plan to display advertising logos was not abandoned. The village revitalization group voted by a narrow margin not to include the advertisements, and the seedlings that were planted were removed.

See also 
 Tamboāto Station, a railway station built specially to serve an area famous for rice paddy art in Inakadate, Aomori
 Hill figure
 Nazca Lines
 Crop circle

References

External links 

Inakadate website (bad link?)
Inakadate website (NEW?)
2012 Paddy Art Making from Inakadate website
2014 Paddy Art Making from Inakadate website
Connected field paddy art in Anjō

Artistic techniques
Land art
Tourist attractions in Aomori Prefecture
Japanese folk art